Traffic signs or road signs are signs erected at the side of or above roads to give instructions or provide information to road users. The earliest signs were simple wooden or stone milestones. Later, signs with directional arms were introduced, for example the fingerposts in the United Kingdom and their wooden counterparts in Saxony.

With traffic volumes increasing since the 1930s, many countries have adopted pictorial signs or otherwise simplified and standardized their signs to overcome language barriers, and enhance traffic safety. Such pictorial signs use symbols (often silhouettes) in place of words and are usually based on international protocols. Such signs were first developed in Europe, and have been adopted by most countries to varying degrees.

International conventions
International conventions such as Vienna Convention on Road Signs and Signals have helped to achieve a degree of uniformity in Traffic signing in various countries. Countries have also unilaterally (to some extent) followed other countries in order to avoid confusion.

Categories

Traffic signs can be grouped into several types. For example, Annexe 1 of the Vienna Convention on Road Signs and Signals (1968), which on 30 June 2004 had 52 signatory countries, defines eight categories of signs:

 A. Danger warning signs
 B. Priority signs
 C. Prohibitory or restrictive signs
 D. Mandatory signs
 E. Special regulation signs
 F. Information, facilities, or service signs
 G. Direction, position, or indication signs
 H. Additional panels

In the United States, Canada, Ireland, Australia, and New Zealand signs are categorized as follows:
 Regulatory signs
 Warning signs
 Guide signs
 Street name signs
 Route marker signs
 Expressway signs
 Freeway signs
 Welcome signs
 Informational signs
 Recreation and cultural interest signs
 Emergency management (civil defense) signs
 Temporary traffic control (construction or work zone) signs
 School signs
 Railroad and light rail signs
 Bicycle signs

In the United States, the categories, placement, and graphic standards for traffic signs and pavement markings are legally defined in the Federal Highway Administration's Manual on Uniform Traffic Control Devices as the standard.

A rather informal distinction among the directional signs is the one between advance directional signs, interchange directional signs, and reassurance signs. Advance directional signs appear at a certain distance from the interchange, giving information for each direction. A number of countries do not give information for the road ahead (so-called "pull-through" signs), and only for the directions left and right. Advance directional signs enable drivers to take precautions for the exit (e.g., switch lanes, double check whether this is the correct exit, slow down).
They often do not appear on lesser roads, but are normally posted on expressways and motorways, as drivers would be missing exits without them. While each nation has its own system, the first approach sign for a motorway exit is mostly placed at least  from the actual interchange. After that sign, one or two additional advance directional signs typically follow before the actual interchange itself.

History

The earliest road signs were milestones, giving distance or direction; for example, the Romans erected stone columns throughout their empire giving the distance to Rome. According to Strabo, Mauryas erected signboards at distance of 10 stades to mark their roads. In the Middle Ages, multidirectional signs at intersections became common, giving directions to cities and towns.

In 1686, the first known Traffic Regulation Act in Europe was established by King Peter II of Portugal. This act foresaw the placement of priority signs in the narrowest streets of Lisbon, stating which traffic should back up to give way. One of these signs still exists at Salvador street, in the neighborhood of Alfama.

The first modern road signs erected on a wide scale were designed for riders of high or "ordinary" bicycles in the late 1870s and early 1880s. These machines were fast, silent and their nature made them difficult to control, moreover their riders travelled considerable distances and often preferred to tour on unfamiliar roads. For such riders, cycling organizations began to erect signs that warned of potential hazards ahead (particularly steep hills), rather than merely giving distance or directions to places, thereby contributing the sign type that defines "modern" traffic signs.

The development of automobiles encouraged more complex signage systems using more than just text-based notices. One of the first modern-day road sign systems was devised by the Italian Touring Club in 1895. By 1900, a Congress of the International League of Touring Organizations in Paris was considering proposals for standardization of road signage. In 1903 the British government introduced four "national" signs based on shape, but the basic patterns of most traffic signs were set at the 1908 International Road Congress in Paris. In 1909, nine European governments agreed on the use of four pictorial symbols, indicating "bump", "curve", "intersection", and "grade-level railroad crossing". The intensive work on international road signs that took place between 1926 and 1949 eventually led to the development of the European road sign system. Both Britain and the United States developed their own road signage systems, both of which were adopted or modified by many other nations in their respective spheres of influence. The UK adopted a version of the European road signs in 1964 and, over past decades, North American signage began using some symbols and graphics mixed in with English.

In the U.S., the first road signs were erected by the American Automobile Association (AAA). Starting in 1906, regional AAA clubs began paying for and installing wooden signs to help motorists find their way. In 1914, AAA started a cohesive transcontinental signage project, installing more than 4,000 signs in one stretch between Los Angeles and Kansas City alone.

Over the years, change was gradual. Pre-industrial signs were stone or wood, but with the development of Darby's method of smelting iron using coke-painted cast iron became favoured in the late 18th and 19th centuries. Cast iron continued to be used until the mid-20th century, but it was gradually displaced by aluminium or other materials and processes, such as vitreous enamelled and/or pressed malleable iron, or (later) steel. Since 1945 most signs have been made from sheet aluminium with adhesive plastic coatings; these are normally retroreflective for nighttime and low-light visibility. Before the development of reflective plastics, reflectivity was provided by glass reflectors set into the lettering and symbols.

New generations of traffic signs based on electronic displays can also change their text (or, in some countries, symbols) to provide for "intelligent control" linked to automated traffic sensors or remote manual input. In over 20 countries, real-time Traffic Message Channel incident warnings are conveyed directly to vehicle navigation systems using inaudible signals carried via FM radio, 3G cellular data and satellite broadcasts. Finally, cars can pay tolls and trucks pass safety screening checks using video numberplate scanning, or RFID transponders in windshields linked to antennae over the road, in support of on-board signalling, toll collection, and travel time monitoring.

Yet another "medium" for transferring information ordinarily associated with visible signs is RIAS (Remote Infrared Audible Signage), e.g., "talking signs" for print-handicapped (including blind/low-vision/illiterate) people. These are infra-red transmitters serving the same purpose as the usual graphic signs when received by an appropriate device such as a hand-held receiver or one built into a cell phone.

Then, finally, in 1914, the world's first electric traffic signal is put into place on the corner of Euclid Avenue and East 105th Street in Cleveland, Ohio, on August 5.

Automatic traffic sign recognition
Cars are beginning to feature cameras with automatic traffic sign recognition, beginning 2008 with the Opel Insignia. It mainly recognizes speed limits and no-overtaking areas. It also uses GPS and a database over speed limits, which is useful in the many countries which signpost city speed limits with a city name sign, not a speed limit sign.

Image gallery

Rail traffic
Rail traffic has often a lot of differences between countries and often not much similarity with road signs. Rail traffic has professional drivers who have much longer education that what's normal for road driving licenses. Differences between neighboring countries cause problems for cross border traffic and causes need for additional education for drivers.

See also

Traffic signs by country
Button copy
Comparison of European traffic signs
 Comparison of traffic signs in English-speaking countries
Comparison of MUTCD-influenced traffic signs
Exit number
Fingerpost
 Gantry (transport)
 Glossary of road transport terms
List of public signage typefaces
Off-Network Tactical Diversion Route
 One-way traffic
Road surface marking
Road marking machine
 Road signs in Canada
 Road signs in the United States
Rules of the road
Street sign theft
Tourist sign
Traffic light
Traffic sign design
 Variable-message sign
 Warning sign

References

External links

Asia
Pakistani Traffic Rules and Road Signs
Indian Traffic Rules and Signals
The Road User's Code: The Language of the Road by the Transport Department of the Government of the Hong Kong SAR

Europe
Signs and markings British traffic signs from the Highway Code
Danish traffic signs 
securite-routiere.gouv.fr 
Know Your Traffic Signs - Department for Transport (UK)
German traffic signs and signals
Norma 8.,1-IC Style manual for road signs in Spain

North America

Canada
Government of Quebec traffic control devices library - Extensive list of all road signs and signals from the Quebec Transport Ministry 
Road Signs in Ontario , from the Ontario Ministry of Transportation.
ICBC – Signs, signals and road markings from ICBC

United States of America 
Federal Highway Administration publications:
Part 2: Signs from the Manual on Uniform Traffic Control Devices
Standard Highway Signs and Markings
Manual of Traffic Signs – private website based on the MUTCD
Ensuring That Traffic Signs Are Visible at Night: Federal Regulations Congressional Research Service
Traffic Signs Evolution Since 1925 to Present

Typefaces
Public domain fonts used on road signs

Other
Traffic signs in Russian Federation
A collection of street signs and traffic lights
Photos of directional signage on motorways
 Road signs
Traffic signs in Croatia

 
Road safety
Street furniture
Symbols